Mark Benjamin Jackson (born May 15, 1969) is a retired track and field athlete from Canada, who competed in the men's 400m hurdles event. He competed for his native country at the 1992 Summer Olympics in Barcelona, Spain, finishing in 19th place. He was born in Toronto, Ontario.

In addition to his successes as a track and field athlete, Jackson is a world medalist in the sport of dragon boat racing. As a member of the Slipstream Dragon Boat crew from Toronto, Ontario, Jackson won a bronze medal in the premier mixed 500 meter final at the Lee Kum Kee Dragon Boat Carnival and Club Crew World Championships in Hong Kong in 2012.

References
 Mark Jackson's profile at the Canada Olympic Committee

External links
 
 
 
 
 

1969 births
Living people
Canadian male hurdlers
Athletes (track and field) at the 1992 Summer Olympics
Olympic track and field athletes of Canada
World Athletics Championships athletes for Canada
Athletes from Toronto
Dragon boat racing